Garbarino or similar terms may refer to:

People
Andrew Garbarino (born 1984), American attorney and politician
Henri Garbarino, Canadian football player
James Garbarino, American psychologist
Steve Garbarino, American journalist

Other uses
Garbarino (company), Argentina-based retail company